Shane Nelson (born May 25, 1955) is a former professional American football player who played linebacker for six seasons for the Buffalo Bills. Nelson was discovered at an open trial held by the Dallas Cowboys. He was the only player, out of 1,800, to be offered an NFL contract. However, Nelson rejected Dallas' offer and signed for the Bills where he felt he had more of a chance of playing. . During his time in Buffalo he was a part of the "Bermuda Triangle" which also consisted of Fred Smerlas and Jim Haslett. He is also a member of the NJCAA Hall of Fame.

1955 births
American football linebackers
Baylor Bears football players
Blinn Buccaneers football players
Buffalo Bills players
Living people
Players of American football from Texas
People from San Patricio County, Texas